Stadion OSiR (full name in Polish: Stadion Ośrodka Sportu i Rekreacji w Gorzowie Wielkopolskim) is a football stadium in Gorzów Wielkopolski, Poland.

Sport in Gorzów Wielkopolski
Buildings and structures in Gorzów Wielkopolski
Sports venues in Lubusz Voivodeship
Stilon Gorzów Wielkopolski